Dendroseris is a genus of flowering plants in the sunflower family.

 Species
All the species are endemic to the Juan Fernández Islands in the South Pacific, part of the Republic of Chile.

Recent research place this genus as a subgenus in Sonchus (Kim & Mejías 2012).

References

 
Endemic flora of the Juan Fernández Islands
Asteraceae genera
Taxonomy articles created by Polbot